The 2000 Chicago Cubs season was the 129th season of the Chicago Cubs franchise, the 125th in the National League and the 85th at Wrigley Field. The Cubs finished sixth and last in the National League Central with a record of 65–97.

During this season, the Cubs played in the first game held outside North America on Opening Day. The Cubs played the New York Mets in front of over 55,000 at the Tokyo Dome in Japan. The Cubs won the game by a score of 5-3.

Offseason
 October 5, 1999: Lance Johnson was released by the Chicago Cubs.
 November 22, 1999: Todd Van Poppel signed as a free agent with the Chicago Cubs.

Regular season
On May 11, 2000, Glenallen Hill was responsible for a memorable event in the annals of Chicago Cubs baseball lore. On that day, Hill became the first and so far only player to hit a pitched ball onto the roof of a five-story residential building across the street from the left field wall of Wrigley Field.

Sammy Sosa, despite hitting only 50 home runs (he had hit over 60 the previous two seasons), won his only home run crown.

Season standings

Record vs. opponents

Notable Transactions
June 5, 2000: Dontrelle Willis was drafted by the Chicago Cubs in the 8th round of the 2000 amateur draft. Player signed July 6, 2000.
July 21, 2000: Glenallen Hill was traded by the Chicago Cubs to the New York Yankees for Ben Ford and Oswaldo Mairena.
July 31, 2000: Henry Rodriguez was traded by the Chicago Cubs to the Florida Marlins for Ross Gload and Dave Noyce (minors).

Roster

Player stats

Batting

Starters by position 
Note: Pos = Position; G = Games played; AB = At bats; H = Hits; Avg. = Batting average; HR = Home runs; RBI = Runs batted in

Other batters 
Note: G = Games played; AB = At bats; H = Hits; Avg. = Batting average; HR = Home runs; RBI = Runs batted in

Pitching

Starting pitchers 
Note: G = Games pitched; IP = Innings pitched; W = Wins; L = Losses; ERA = Earned run average; SO = Strikeouts

Other pitchers 
Note: G = Games pitched; IP = Innings pitched; W = Wins; L = Losses; ERA = Earned run average; SO = Strikeouts

Relief pitchers 
Note: G = Games pitched; W = Wins; L = Losses; SV = Saves; ERA = Earned run average; SO = Strikeouts

Farm system 

LEAGUE CHAMPIONS: West Tenn, Daytona

References

2000 Chicago Cubs season at Baseball Reference

Chicago Cubs seasons
Chicago Cubs season
Cub